John Peter Boulter (born 18 November 1940) is a British middle-distance runner. He competed in the men's 800 metres at the 1964 Summer Olympics. He was a language master at the Gilberd School and has his picture in the Gilberd Hall of Fame where students celebrated his birthday.

References

1940 births
Living people
Athletes (track and field) at the 1964 Summer Olympics
Athletes (track and field) at the 1966 British Empire and Commonwealth Games
Athletes (track and field) at the 1968 Summer Olympics
British male middle-distance runners
Olympic athletes of Great Britain
Sportspeople from Colchester
Universiade medalists in athletics (track and field)
Universiade gold medalists for Great Britain
Medalists at the 1963 Summer Universiade
Commonwealth Games competitors for England